Tim Buzaglo (born 20 June 1961, in Surbiton) is a British footballer and cricketer.

Football
Buzaglo is a former semi-professional footballer for Woking. He played as a striker, his moment of glory came in the FA Cup Third Round in 1991 at West Bromwich Albion. Trailing 1–0 at half time, Buzaglo scored a hat-trick in the second half to help Woking to a 4–2 win. In the Fourth Round tie, Woking narrowly lost 1–0 to Everton.

Buzaglo was placed in the FA's Team of Heroes to commemorate 125 years of the FA Cup in 2006.

Soon afterwards, Buzaglo suffered a serious injury, and he left Woking after a failed comeback attempt.

Cricket

Between 1982 and 2001, he also played ICC Trophy cricket for Gibraltar.

Personal life
Buzaglo worked as an estate agent for Mann and Co.

References 

Woking F.C. players
Gibraltarian footballers
Gibraltarian cricketers
1961 births
Living people
Association football forwards